The Dutch National Ballet (Dutch: Het Nationale Ballet) is the official and largest ballet company in the Netherlands.

History
The Dutch National Ballet was formed in 1961 when the Amsterdam Ballet and the Nederlands Ballet merged. 
The company has been directed by Sonia Gaskell (1961–1969), Rudi van Dantzig (1969–1991), Wayne Eagling (1991–2003) and is currently directed by Ted Brandsen. It attracts many international artists.

The company has been based at the Dutch National Opera & Ballet (formerly known as Het Muziektheater) in Amsterdam since 1986. It is a regular guest at major festivals across Europe, such as the Edinburgh Festival. The company is committed to new choreography and performs work from current and past resident choreographers: Rudi van Dantzig, Toer van Schayk, Hans van Manen, Maguy Marin and Édouard Lock.

On 13 September 2011, the company celebrated its 50th anniversary with a gala performance in the presence of Queen Beatrix.

Dancers
The Dutch National Ballet employs approximately 90 dancers. Below is a list of principals, soloists, grand sujets, and coryphées.

Principals

 Constantine Allen
 Jakob Feyferlik
 Young Gyu Choi
 Qian Lui
 Maia Makhateli 
 Vito Mazzeo 
 Anna Ol
 Artur Shesterikov
 Olga Smirnova
 James Stout
 Anna Tsygankova 
 Semyon Velichko
 Riho Sakamoto
 Jessica Xuan

Soloists

 Victor Caixeta
 Naira Agvanean
 Floor Eimers
 Suzanna Kaic
 Martin ten Kortenaar
 Salome Leverashvili
 Timothy van Poucke
 Maria Chugai
 Nina Tonoli
 Jingjing Mao
 Edo Wijnen
 Jared Wright
 Sho Yamada
 Yuanyuan Zhang

Grand sujets

 Chloë Réveillon
 Elisabeth Tonev
 Erica Horwood
 Connie Vowles
 Joseph Massarelli
 Giorgi Potskhishvili
 Daniel Montero Real
 Daniel Robert Silva
 Sem Sjouke
 Jan Spunda

Coryphées

 Luiza Bertho
 Nathan Brhane
 Nancy Burer
 Khayla Fitzpatrick
 Hannah de Klein
 Kira Hilli
 Rémy Catalan
 Wendeline Wijkstra
 Davi Ramos
 Conor Walmsley

References

External links
 
 Dutch National Ballet at Answers.com

 
National Ballet, Dutch
Performing groups established in 1961